Sky Larks is a 1934 animated short produced by Walter Lantz Productions and is part of the Oswald the Lucky Rabbit series.

Plot
Oswald and a big beagle are at a cinema watching a documentary about explorers who travel in hot air balloons. The documentary consists of footage of real-life balloonist Auguste Piccard. Oswald is amazed, and after the show decides to become a balloonist himself.

At a fairground, a large crowd gathers to see Oswald take off in his balloon. The balloon is a large hot water bottle and the carriage is a pot-bellied stove. Oswald invites the big beagle, who is in the crowd, to join him. The beagle refuses, but as the balloon rises, its anchor snags his pants and pulls them off. Embarrassed, he grabs the anchor and flies away with Oswald.

Oswald's balloon rapidly ascends and goes so far that they reach interplanetary space. They pass through the "Milky Way", populated by bottles of milk, and finally crash land on the planet Mars, much of which seems related to the "martial" topic of war. They see a giant sipping "Nitro Soup" and eating bombs. Oswald and the big beagle flee, only to unknowingly run into the bore of a huge cannon. The cannon shoots them airborne and they land in the giant's soup bowl.

The giant recognizes them as Earthlings, and picks them up with his spoon and tries to eat them. After several attempts which they evade, they fall into a salt shaker. The giant puts the lid on the shaker, trapping them, and then calls for a dance. A variety of animate implements of war then put on a dance, including guns, rockets and gas masks. While the giant is distracted, Oswald and the beagle rock the salt shaker back and forth until they turn it upside down. By putting their legs through the shaker's holes, they are able run. They run into a pitcher, breaking the shaker, at which the giant notices their escape and grabs them.

The pair then find that the whole affair was a dream, as they awaken back in the now-empty cinema, with the janitor shaking them awake. Nevertheless, they are still frightened and run out of the cinema in a panic, to the bewilderment of the janitor.

Notes
The big beagle is the father of the girl beagle (Oswald's third girlfriend). His appearance and personality are very similar to Wimpy, a character from the Popeye cartoons.

See also
 Oswald the Lucky Rabbit filmography

References

External links
Sky Larks at the Big Cartoon Database

1934 films
1934 animated films
1930s American animated films
1930s animated short films
1930s science fiction films
American aviation films
American black-and-white films
Films about dreams
Films about extraterrestrial life
Films directed by Walter Lantz
Films set in a movie theatre
Films about giants
Mars in film
Oswald the Lucky Rabbit cartoons
Universal Pictures short films
Walter Lantz Productions shorts
American science fiction films
Universal Pictures animated short films
Animated films about dogs